Pablo Abel Argañaraz Paradi (born 21 July 1998) is an Argentine professional footballer who plays as a centre-forward for San Martín de Tucumán, on loan from Central Córdoba SdE.

Club career
Argañaraz started out at Argentinos del Norte at the age of six, remaining until the age of thirteen when he joined San Martín of San Miguel de Tucumán. In 2013, Argañaraz signed for Lanús. He finished as top scorer in his second year in their academy. In January 2019, Argañaraz was loaned to Torneo Federal A with Juventud Antoniana. He made his senior debut in a 2–0 defeat to San Martín de Formosa on 3 February. Three further appearances followed, which preceded the centre-forward scoring three goals in three matches against Crucero del Norte, Altos Hornos Zapla and Gimnasia y Tiro.

After nine matches for Juventud Antoniana, Argañaraz returned to Lanús in June 2019 but soon departed on permanent terms to newly promoted Primera División team Central Córdoba. His first appearance didn't arrive until March 2020, when he played the final thirteen minutes of a Copa de la Superliga group stage loss at home to Newell's Old Boys; having replaced Cristian Chávez. On 7 June 2022, Argañaraz joined San Martín de Tucumán on loan for the rest of the year.

International career
Argañaraz represented Argentina at the 2015 South American U-17 Championship in Paraguay. He made nine appearances, though only three of which were as a starter. In 2016, he was called up to train with the U20s.

Career statistics
.

Notes

References

External links

1998 births
Living people
Sportspeople from San Miguel de Tucumán
Argentine footballers
Association football forwards
Torneo Federal A players
Argentine Primera División players
Club Atlético Lanús footballers
Juventud Antoniana footballers
Central Córdoba de Santiago del Estero footballers
San Martín de Tucumán footballers